David Charles Gooding (21 November 1947 – 13 December 2009) was a Professor of History and Philosophy of Science, and the Director of the Science Studies Centre, at the University of Bath, UK . He was President of the History of Science Section of the BAAS (2002–2003).

Career 
For over 30 years Gooding wrote and lectured on the role of visualisation, inference, communication, creativity and human agency in the sciences and was a specialist on the life and work of Michael Faraday.  During 2002–2003 he held a Leverhulme Research Fellowship for research on Visualisation in the Sciences.  From 1991 to 1993 he held a Research Leave Fellowship from the MRC-ESRC-SERC (Joint Research Councils Initiative on HCI-Cognitive Science) for research on Simulating Natural Intelligence.

Gooding's work is characterised by a multi-disciplinary approach, combining perspectives and methods from different fields including philosophy, history, sociology, art and cognitive psychology. Gooding's notion of Construal is of key importance to the field of Empirical Modelling within Computer Science.

Selected works

Books

Book chapters

Journal articles

References

1947 births
2009 deaths
Academics of the University of Bath
20th-century British philosophers